In enzymology, a 2-dehydropantolactone reductase (B-specific) is an enzyme that catalyzes the chemical reaction

(R)-pantolactone + NADP+  2-dehydropantolactone + NADPH + H+

Thus, the two substrates of this enzyme are (R)-pantolactone and NADP+, whereas its 3 products are 2-dehydropantolactone, NADPH, and H+.

This enzyme belongs to the family of oxidoreductases, specifically those acting on the CH-OH group of donor with NAD+ or NADP+ as acceptor. The systematic name of this enzyme class is (R)-pantolactone:NADP+ oxidoreductase (B-specific). Other names in common use include 2-oxopantoyl lactone reductase, 2-ketopantoyl lactone reductase, ketopantoyl lactone reductase, and 2-dehydropantoyl-lactone reductase (B-specific).

References

 

EC 1.1.1
NADPH-dependent enzymes
Enzymes of unknown structure